Lethbridge was a territorial electoral district for the Legislative Assembly of Northwest Territories, Canada.

The riding was first contested in 1891 and would dissolve upon formation of the Province of Alberta in 1905.

Members of the Legislative Assembly (MLAs) 
Charles Alexander Magrath 1891-1898
Leverett George De Veber 1898-1905

Election results

1902 election

See also
Lethbridge Alberta provincial electoral district.

References

External links 
Website of the Legislative Assembly of Northwest Territories

Former electoral districts of Northwest Territories